In probability theory, Lorden's inequality is a bound for the moments of overshoot for a stopped sum of random variables, first published by Gary Lorden in 1970. Overshoots play a central role in renewal theory.

Statement of inequality

Let X1, X2, ... be independent and identically distributed positive random variables and define the sum Sn = X1 + X2 + ... + Xn. Consider the first time Sn exceeds a given value b and at that time compute Rb = Sn − b. Rb is called the overshoot or excess at b. Lorden's inequality states that the expectation of this overshoot is bounded as

Proof

Three proofs are known due to Lorden, Carlsson and Nerman and Chang.

See also

 Wald's equation

References

Stochastic processes
Probabilistic inequalities